The Players Series, titled as the Webex Players Series for sponsorship reasons, is a series of professional golf tournaments played in Australia with men and women competing in the same field, although they play from different tees. The series began in 2021. The tournaments are played as part of both the PGA Tour of Australasia and WPGA Tour of Australasia schedules.

2020–21 season

2021–22 season

2022–23 season

Notes

References

External links
PGA Tour of Australasia
WPGA Tour of Australasia

Golf tournaments in Australia
PGA Tour of Australasia events
ALPG Tour events